Vione is a comune in the province of Brescia, in Lombardy. It is situated above the right bank of the river Oglio, in upper Val Camonica. Neighbouring communes are Edolo, Ponte di Legno, Temù and Vezza d'Oglio. Its coat of arms shows a castle with an eagle over it.

References

Cities and towns in Lombardy